This is a list of topics related to Qatar. Those interested in the subject can monitor changes to the pages by clicking on Related changes in the sidebar.

Qatar
Qatar
 International rankings of Qatar
 Outline of Qatar
 Wikipedia:WikiProject Qatar

Notable Qataris 
 House of Al Thani

Qatari businessmen
 Abdul Aziz bin Nasser al-Thani
 Ali bin Towar al-Kuwari
 Abdulaziz bin Mohammed al-Rabban
 Ahmed bin Jassim Al Thani
 Issa Abu Issa
 Khalid bin Mohammed al-Rabban
 Mohamed bin Abdulrahman M. Hassan Fakhro
 Nasser Al-Khelaifi
 Nasser Mohamed
 Hader Mohamed Alsuwaidi

Qatari politicians
 Prime ministers of Qatar
 Sheikh Abdullah bin Khalifah Al Thani
 Sheikh Tamim Bin Hamad Al Thani

Qatari sportspeople

Olympic competitors for Qatar
 Talal Mansour
 Bilal Saad Mubarak
 Mubarak Al-Nubi
 Khamis Abdullah Saifeldin
 Ahmed Ibrahim Warsama

Qatari athletes
 Abdullah Baiat
 Daham Najim Bashir
 Abdullah Ahmad Hassan
 Ibrahim Ismail Muftah
 James Kwalia
 Talal Mansour
 Bilal Saad Mubarak
 Mubarak Al-Nubi
 Musa Amer Obaid
 Khamis Abdullah Saifeldin
 Saif Saaeed Shaheen
 Mubarak Hassan Shami
 Mohammed Suleiman
 Majed Saeed Sultan
 Ahmed Ibrahim Warsama
 Sultan Khamis Zaman

Qatari basketball players
 Hashim Zaidan

Qatari chess players
 Zhu Chen

Qatari weightlifters
 Nader Sufyan Abbas
 Said Saif Asaad
 Jaber Saeed Salem

Buildings and structures in Qatar
 Amiri Diwan of the State of Qatar
 Aspire Tower
 Commercialbank Plaza
 Doha Tower
 Dubai Towers - Doha
 Old Amiri Palace, Doha
 Qatar National Convention Centre
 Qatar National Theater
 Sheraton Grand Doha Resort & Convention Hotel
 Tallest buildings in Doha
 Tornado Tower

Airports in Qatar
Airports in Qatar
 Doha International Airport
 Hamad International Airport

Bridges in Qatar
 Qatar–Bahrain Causeway

Forts in Qatar
 Al Koot Fort
 Al Wajbah Fort
 Al Zubara Fort
 Ar Rakiyat Fort
 Barzan Towers
 Qal'at Murair

Lighthouses in Qatar
Lighthouses in Qatar
 Jazirat Halul Lighthouse

Malls in Qatar
 B Square Mall
 City Center Doha
 Doha Festival City
 Ezdan mall
Lulu Mall
 Hyatt Plaza
 Lagoona Mall
 Landmark Mall Doha
 Mall of Qatar 
 Royal Plaza
 Tawar Mall
 The Mall
 Villagio Mall

Museums in Qatar
Museums in Qatar
 Mathaf: Arab Museum of Modern Art
 Museum of Islamic Art, Doha
 National Museum of Qatar
 Qatar National Museum
 Sheikh Faisal Bin Qassim Al Thani Museum

Places of worship in Qatar
 Qatar State Mosque
 Spiral Mosque
over 5000 mosques in Qatar

Sports venues in Qatar
 Khalifa International Stadium

Football venues in Qatar
 List of football stadiums in Qatar
 Al-Ahly Stadium
 Al-Gharrafa Stadium
 Al-Khawr Stadium
 Al-Wakrah Stadium
 Grand Hamad Stadium
 Jassim Bin Hamad Stadium
 Khalifa International Stadium
 Qatar SC Stadium
 Umm-Affai Stadium
over 20 more top class stadiums being built for the 2022 world cup

Communications in Qatar
Communications in Qatar
 Internet in Qatar
 Ooredoo
 Vodafone Qatar

Qatari culture
Culture of Qatar

Art in Qatar
 Qatari art
 Collecting practices of the Al-Thani Family
 Public art in Qatar
7 (sculpture)
Gandhi's Three Monkeys
Perceval (sculpture)

Events in Qatar
 Qatar National Day

Festivals in Qatar
 Festivals in Qatar

Food in Qatar
 Qatari cuisine

Languages of Qatar
 Gulf Arabic

Literature of Qatar
 Qatari folklore
 Qatari literature

National symbols of Qatar
 Emblem of Qatar
 Flag of Qatar
 National anthem of Qatar

Qatari music
 Music of Qatar
 Qatar Philharmonic Orchestra

Religion in Qatar
 Religion in Qatar
 Buddhism in Qatar
 Christianity in Qatar
Catholic Church in Qatar
Protestantism in Qatar
 Hinduism in Qatar
 Islam in Qatar

Theatre in Qatar
 Theatre in Qatar

World Heritage Sites in Qatar
 World Heritage Sites in Qatar: Zubarah

Economy of Qatar
Economy of Qatar
 Agriculture in Qatar
 Energy in Qatar
 Natural gas in Qatar
 Financial services in Qatar
 Banks in Qatar
 Qatar Exchange
 Qatari riyal
 Tourism in Qatar
Tourist attractions in Qatar
Katara Cultural Village
 Trade unions in Qatar
 Qatarization

Companies in Qatar
Companies of Qatar
 Qatargas
 QatarEnergy
 Qatar Steel

Education in Qatar
Education in Qatar
 Education City, Qatar
 Supreme Education Council

Schools in Qatar
 List of schools in Qatar
 American School of Doha
 The Cambridge School, Doha, Qatar
 Doha College
 Gulf English School
  International School of Choueifat Doha
 Qatar Academy
 Qatar International School
over 50 schools and world known universities in Qatar Foundation

Universities and colleges in Qatar
 List of universities and colleges in Qatar
 Carnegie Mellon University (Qatar)
 Texas A&M University at Qatar
 University of Qatar

Environment of Qatar
 Friends of the Environment Centre
 Geology of Qatar
 Natural gas in Qatar
 Protected areas of Qatar
 Wildlife of Qatar
 Flora of Qatar
 Fauna of Qatar
 Birds of Qatar
 Mammals of Qatar

Geography of Qatar
Geography of Qatar
 Bays of Qatar
 Bay of Zekreet
 Doha Bay
 Demographics of Qatar
 Hills of Qatar
 Islands of Qatar
 Peninsulas of Qatar
 Salt flats of Qatar
 Time in Qatar
 Wadis of Qatar

Cities and towns in Qatar
 Cities in Qatar
 Al Wakrah
 Ar Rayyan
 Doha
 Dukhan
 Lusail
 Mesaieed
 Zubarah

Municipalities of Qatar
 Municipalities of Qatar
 Ad Dawhah
Communities in Doha
 Al Daayen
 Al Khor
 Al Rayyan
 Al-Shahaniya
 Al Shamal
 Al Wakrah
 Umm Salal

Zones of Qatar
Zones of Qatar

Government of Qatar
 Cabinet of Qatar
 Consultative Assembly of Qatar
 List of prime ministers of Qatar
 The General Secretariat for Development Planning
 Permanent Population Committee
 Qatar Fund for Development
 Qatar National Vision 2030

Emirs of Qatar
 List of emirs of Qatar
 Mohammed bin Thani
 Jassim bin Mohammed Al Thani
 Abdullah bin Jassim Al Thani
 Ali bin Abdullah Al Thani
 Ahmad bin Ali Al Thani
 Khalifa bin Hamad Al Thani
 Hamad bin Khalifa Al Thani
 Tamim bin Hamad Al Thani

Elections in Qatar
 Next Qatari general election

Foreign relations of Qatar
 Foreign relations of Qatar
 Diplomatic missions in Qatar
 Diplomatic missions of Qatar
 2017–19 Qatar diplomatic crisis
 Qatar corruption scandal at the European Parliament
 Qatar Fund for Development
 Qatari foreign aid

Law enforcement in Qatar
 Law enforcement in Qatar
 Qatar State Security

History of Qatar
History of Qatar
 Archaeology of Qatar
 Archaeological sites in Qatar
Al Da'asa
Jebel Jassassiyeh
Murwab
Wadi Debayan
 Timeline of Doha
 Doha Declaration

Human Rights in Qatar 
Human rights in Qatar
 Freedom of religion in Qatar

Qatari media
Media of Qatar
 Internet in Qatar
 Newspapers in Qatar
 Television in Qatar
 Al Jazeera

Al Jazeera
 Al Jazeera
 Al Jazeera Children's Channel
 Al Jazeera International
 Al Jazeera Live
 Al Jazeera Urdu
 Al Jazeera bombing memo
 Control Room (film)
 David Frost
 Akram Khozam
 Rageh Omaar
 Veronica Pedrosa
 Barbara Serra

Military of Qatar
Military of Qatar
 Qatar Air Force
 Qatar Armed Forces
 Qatari Emiri Navy
 Military ranks of Qatar
 Wars involving Qatar

Organisations based in Qatar
 Global Dryland Alliance
 Qatar Foundation
 Qatar Red Crescent Society
 Qatar Scientific Club
 The Scout and Guide Association of Qatar

Politics of Qatar
Politics of Qatar
 Consultative Assembly of Qatar

Political parties in Qatar
(no political parties exist)

Public parks and gardens in Qatar
 Al Bidda Park
 Aspire Park

Qatari society
 Demographics of Qatar
 Healthcare in Qatar
 Hospitals in Qatar
 Public holidays in Qatar
 Qatar National Day
 Qatari nationality law

Sport in Qatar
Sport in Qatar
 ASPIRE Academy for Sports Excellence
 Qatar national basketball team

Football in Qatar
 Football in Qatar
 1988 AFC Asian Cup
2022 FIFA World Cup
 Agony of Doha
 Qatar Football Association
 Qatar football league system
 Qatar Stars League
 Qatargas League
 Qatar National First Division
 Qatar national football team
 Qatar national under-17 football team
 Qatar national under-20 football team
 Qatari Second Division
 Qatari Top Scorers

Qatari football clubs
 Al-Ahli Sports Club
 Al-Arabi Sports Club
 Al-Gharrafa
 Al Rayyan Sports Club
 Al-Sadd
 Al-Siliya
 Al-Wakra
 Khor (football club)
 Qatar Sports Club
 Umm-Salal Sports Club

Golf tournaments in Qatar
 Qatar Masters
 Doha Golf Club

Qatar at the Olympics
 Qatar at the Olympics
 Qatar at the 1984 Summer Olympics
 Qatar at the 1992 Summer Olympics
 Qatar at the 2000 Summer Olympics
 Qatar at the 2004 Summer Olympics

Tennis tournaments in Qatar
 Qatar ExxonMobil Open
 Qatar Total Open

Transport in Qatar
Transport in Qatar

 Doha Metro
 Al Majd Road

Airlines of Qatar
 List of airlines of Qatar
 Qatar Airways
 Qatar Amiri Flight
 Qatar Executive

Travel in Qatar
 Qatari passport
 Visa policy of Qatar
 Visa requirements for Qatari citizens

See also
Lists of country-related topics - similar lists for other countries